Jeremy Dawson (born in Texas, but raised in Shawnee, Oklahoma, USA) is best known as the keyboardist of the American new wave/indie rock band Shiny Toy Guns.

Bands

Jeremy was the driving force behind the act Cloud2Ground. He is also the co-founder of Shiny Toy Guns.

Cloud2Ground (1996-2000)

Bandmate, Chad Petree participated in Cloud2Ground with Jeremy.

Slyder

The Shiny Toy Guns song "You Are the One" has its roots in Slyder's trance song "Neo", put out under Chad and Jeremy's moniker. "Neo" and "Score" was used in the video game Grand Theft Auto III.

Shiny Toy Guns (2002-present)

Jeremy created Shiny Toy Guns with bandmate Chad Petree in 2002. He is the keyboardist and bassist.

Hybridigital (2009-2010)

Hybridigital is Jeremy and Chad's side project, and subsection of Shiny Toy Guns, where they put on live shows of remixes of their Shiny Toy Guns songs. They feature live guitars, keyboards, and (male) vocals.

Mirror Machines (2010)

The record production name of Jeremy Dawson and Chad Petree of Shiny Toy Guns

MXMS (Me and My Shadow) (2013-present)
MXMS is a multimedia art and music project. The name MXMS stands for "Me and My Shadow". Dawson formed this project with vocalist Ariel Levitan, calling their music "funeral pop."

Equipment 
Dawson has been seen using an M-Audio 88key Midi Controller with a V-Synth Module; Fender Jazz Bass with Ampeg SVT Head, and an Alesis Micron that is also played by the lead singer, Chad.  Jeremy tends to cover the brand name on most of his gear with black tape.

His current live synthesizers are the Roland V-Synth XT, Roland JV-1080, and Roland Juno-G, and the Korg Triton. All of his programming is done in Logic.

References 

1978 births
Living people
Musicians from Oklahoma
Musicians from Texas
People from Shawnee, Oklahoma
Shiny Toy Guns members
21st-century American keyboardists